Delporte is a lunar impact crater on the far side of the Moon. It overlies part of the northwestern rim of the huge walled plain Fermi, and the crater Litke is nearly attached to the southeastern rim. The crater is named after Eugène Joseph Delporte.

The rim of this crater is only marginally worn, although it is not quite circular and the edge is somewhat uneven. There is a shelf running along the northern inner wall. At the midpoint is a central ridge that extends to the northward.

See also 
 1274 Delportia, minor planet

References 

 
 
 
 
 
 
 
 
 
 
 
 

Impact craters on the Moon